Bus transport is the oldest public transport service in Berlin, the capital city of Germany, having been introduced in 1846. Since 1929, services have been operated by the Berlin Transport Company (German: Berliner Verkehrsbetriebe, BVG), although during the Cold War-era division of the city they operated in West Berlin only. BVG's fleet consists of 1,300 vehicles, which cover 300,000 kilometres per day.

History
30 October 1846 saw the first bus services from the Concessionierte Berliner Omnibus-Compagnie. In 1868, a new company was created, the ABOAG (Allgemeinen Berliner Omnibus Actien Gesellschaft) which on 1 January 1929 merged with other Berlin public transport companies to create the BVG.

After the opening of the Berlin Wall, the transport companies were no longer able to cope with the traffic, and so once again, solo buses by other transport companies and 100 hired coaches were used. The 3-digit numbering system was unified and implemented on 2 June 1991, just before the reunification of BVG in 1 January 1992.

Routes

Normal buses
Normal bus routes make up most of the network and consist of around 120 lines, numbered from 100 to 399. The most famous line is the 100, which serves the tourist route from Alexanderplatz to the Zoological Garden passing many of Berlin's sights. The suburban buses, operating outside Berlin and not managed by BVG, are included in the tariff area of Berlin public transport.

Each bus line has a 3-digit number. The second digit indicates the borough in which the line runs:
 0 = across more than 1 or 2 boroughs
 1 = for the former boroughs of Wilmersdorf and Zehlendorf
 2 = for the district of Reinickendorf
 3 = for the district of Spandau
 4 = for the districts of Mitte and Friedrichshain-Kreuzberg
 5 = for the district of Pankow and the former one of Hohenschönhausen
 6 = for the district of Treptow-Köpenick
 7 = for the districts of Tempelhof-Schöneberg and Neukölln
 8 = for the former district of Steglitz
 9 = for the district of Marzahn-Hellersdorf and the former one of Lichtenberg

MetroBus
As for the MetroTram lines, there are 19 MetroBus lines, each running every 10 minutes with a 24-hour service. Unlike the other bus lines, they are shown on many tramway maps and on some railway maps of the city.

The MetroBus routes are:
 M11: Dahlem-Dorf – Schöneweide
 M19: Grunewald – Mehringdamm
 M21: Rosenthal – Jungfernheide
 M27: Pankow – Jungfernheide
 M29: Grunewald – Hermannplatz
 M32: Rathaus Spandau – Dallgow-Döberitz, Havelpark
M36 (formerly 236 and X36): Am Omnibushof – U Haselhorst
 M37: Spandau – Staaken
 M41: Sonnenallee – Hauptbahnhof
 M44: Buckow – Hermannstraße
 M45: Spandau – Zoologischer Garten
 M46: Zoologischer Garten – Britz-Süd
 M48: Zehlendorf – Alexanderplatz
 M49: Heerstraße/Nennhauser Damm – Zoologischer Garten
 M76: Walter-Schreiber-Platz – Lichtenrade
 M77: Marienfelde, Waldsassener Straße – Alt-Mariendorf
 M82: Marienfelde, Waldsassener Straße – Rathaus Steglitz
 M85: Lichterfelde Süd – Hauptbahnhof

Express bus
The express buses are 13 rapid lines, mainly used to reach the airports or linking the suburbs to the city centre, with far fewer stops. The most famous route is the former TXL bus line (Tegel Airport – Alexanderplatz), which ceased service after the closure of Tegel airport.
 X7: Flughafen BER – Rudow
 X10: Zoologischer Garten – Teltow, Rammrath-Brücke
 X11: Krumme Lanke – Schöneweide
 X21: Märkisches Viertel, Quickborner Straße – U Jakob-Kaiser-Platz
 X33: Märkisches Viertel, Wilhelmsruher Damm – Rathaus Spandau
 X34: Kladow – Zoologischer Garten
 X49: Staaken – Messe Nord/ICC
 X54: Pankow – Hellersdorf
 X69: Marzahn – Köpenick, Müggelschlößchenweg
 X71: U Alt-Mariendorf – Flughafen BER
 X76: Walter-Schreiber-Platz – Lichtenrade
 X83: Königin-Luise-Straße/Clayallee – Lichtenrade

Night buses
The night buses (N), consisting of 42 lines and other 8 lines to substitute (from N1 to N9) the U-Bahn (except at weekends). The other lines serve suburban neighbourhoods not served by any public service running in daytime.

N1: Warschauer Straße ↔ Zoologischer Garten
N2: Pankow ↔ Ruhleben
N3: Wittenbergplatz ↔ Mexikoplatz
N5: Alexanderplatz ↔ Hönow
N6: Alt-Tegel ↔ Alt-Mariendorf
N7: Rathaus Spandau ↔ Flughafen BER
N8: Märkisches-Viertel ↔ Hermannstraße
N9: Osloer Straße ↔ Rathaus Steglitz

Other services
Apart from the service buses managed by BVG and other local companies, in the city there are hundreds of private tourist coaches. The main bus station of Berlin is the Zentraler Omnibusbahnhof Berlin ("Central Omnibus Station"), also known as ZOB. It is located in Charlottenburg-Wilmersdorf and linked to the stations of Kaiserdamm (U-Bahn) and Messe Nord/ICC (S-Bahn).

In popular culture
On 18 February 2011 MR Software released OMSI – The Bus Simulator (also known as OMSI – Der Omnibussimulator) for Windows. It is a bus simulator set in the late 1980s in West Berlin that features the MAN SD200 and MAN SD202 double-decker buses with a complex set of functions and made in various years. The player operates these buses along line 92 (now M37) that served the Staaken, Wilhelmstadt, Altstadt, and Falkenhagener Feld localities in the borough of Spandau. On 11 December 2013, MR Software released OMSI 2 – The Bus Simulator for Windows, the sequel to OMSI – The Bus Simulator. It features the MAN NL202 and the MAN NG272 in addition to the buses featured in OMSI (MAN SD200/SD202). The player can enjoy the bus lines 5 (now 130), 92 (now M37) and other add-ons which is community developed. It is sold on Aerosoft, Steam and Halycon.

Fleet 
As of 2015, the BVG bus fleet consisted of 1300 buses.

Single-decker

Lengthened bus

Bendy bus or articulated bus

Double-decker bus 
The BVG operates some 416 double-decker buses.

References

Literature
 Dieter Gammrath, Hein Jung: "Berliner Omnibusse". Alba, Düsseldorf 1988, 
 Gammrath, Jung, Schmiedeke: "Berliner Omnibusse". Alba, Düsseldorf 1999,

External links

 Route planner by WikiRoutes.info
 BVG official website
 Bus transport page on BVG website

Transport in Berlin
Berlin